The 2004 Monte Carlo Rally (formally the 72e Rallye Automobile de Monte-Carlo) was the first round of the 2004 World Rally Championship. The race was held over three days between 23 and 25 January 2004, and was won by Citroën's Sébastien Loeb, his 5th win in the win in the World Rally Championship.

Background

Entry list

Itinerary
All dates and times are CET (UTC+1).

Report

Overall

World Rally Cars

Classification

Special stages

Championship standings

Junior World Rally Championship

Classification

Special stages

Championship standings

References

External links 

 Official website of the World Rally Championship
 2004 Monte Carlo Rally at Rallye-info 

Monte Carlo
Monte Carlo Rally
Rally
Monte Carlo Rally